Thwaite Mills is an industrial museum in Leeds, West Yorkshire, England.  It is a fully restored working water-powered mill built in 1823-25, harnessing the power of the River Aire, and claims to be "one of the best last remaining examples of a water-powered mill in Britain". It is administered by Leeds City Council through Leeds Museums & Galleries. The mill, the manager's house and three associated buildings are all grade II listed buildings.

History
The first known mill on the site was a fulling mill built in 1641, as part of the local industry of manufacturing woollen cloth. In 1823–25 the Aire and Calder Navigation company acquired the mill and redeveloped the site. Two new large waterwheels were built, and the site comprised the mill building, the manager's house, stables, workshop, warehouse and workers' cottages. The cottages were demolished in 1968, but the other buildings remain intact. 

The mill was used for a range of purposes. The firm of W and E Joy used it to crush seeds for lubrication and lighting oil, and imported woods were crushed for the dyeing industry. The Horn family, who took over the mill in 1872, used it to crush flint and china stone for the pottery industry and to grind chalk to make "whiting" for industries ranging from pharmaceuticals to whitewash, then barytes for the paint industry, and until 1975 for the production of putty.

Set on an island between the River Aire and the Aire and Calder Navigation, the mill was as self-sufficient as its owners could make it. There were workshops, orchards, arable land and pasture, and the mill did not have an electricity supply until 1986, instead generating its own power from the two water wheels and a Marshall engine which was purchased to power the Raymond Mill in the 1930s.

Museum
In January 1975, the weir burst and the waterwheels stopped turning. The Thwaite Mills Society was formed by volunteers in 1976 to preserve and restore this important site, and received financial support from the then West Yorkshire County Council. The river weir was rebuilt, and the museum opened in 1990. It is now run by Leeds City Council in partnership with Yorkshire Water.

As well as the functioning waterwheels, the mill contains a collection of machinery used at various times. The manager's house has been restored to reflect life there in the 1940s, and is visited self-guided. The museum site includes a steam crane from 1946 and wildlife areas. A variety of special events is held at the museum.

See also
Listed buildings in Leeds (City and Hunslet Ward - southern area)

References

External links 

 
 
 
 12 panoramic views of Thwaite Mills from VR Leeds
 

Museums in Leeds
Industry museums in England
Watermills in England
Textile museums in the United Kingdom